Type S may refer to:
 Acura Type-S, the high-performance division of Acura
 Driving Emotion Type-S, a racing game
 FBA Type S, a French flying boat
 Handley Page Type S, a prototype British carrier-based fighter
 Lohner Type S, an Austro-Hungarian flying boat
 NW S, an Austro-Hungarian automobile introduced in 1906
 Seversky A8V1 Type S Two Seat Fighter
 Toyota Type S engine, a straight-4 automobile engine
 a type S thermocouple

See also 
 S class (disambiguation)
 S-Type (disambiguation)
 Class S (disambiguation)